The Hosmer Homestead (also known as the Hosmer/Baker Farm) is a historic house located at 138 Baker Avenue in Concord, Massachusetts.

Description and history 
The oldest portion of this -story wood-frame house was probably built c. 1710 by Stephen Hosmer, based on architectural evidence. The property has a long association with the Hosmer family, who were early settlers of Concord and who have played a significant role in the growth and civic life of the town. The house interior has well-preserved Georgian woodwork and plaster.

The house was listed on the National Register of Historic Places on June 3, 1999.

See also
Joseph Hosmer House
National Register of Historic Places listings in Concord, Massachusetts

References

Houses completed in 1710
Houses on the National Register of Historic Places in Concord, Massachusetts
Houses in Concord, Massachusetts
1710 establishments in Massachusetts
Georgian architecture in Massachusetts